Charles Wilmot may refer to:
Charles Wilmot, 1st Viscount Wilmot (c. 1572–1644), English soldier active in Ireland
Charles Wilmot, 3rd Earl of Rochester (1670/71 – 1681), British peer